Uvda, also popularly known as Ovda (wikt:עובדה), may refer to:

Israel
 Operation Uvda, a 1948 military operation establishing "facts on the ground"
 Uvda (Israel), a region in the southern Negev desert
 , an Israeli investigative and current affairs programme
 Ovda Airport, a military air base in the Uvda region of southern Israel

Elsewhere
Ovda Regio, a crustal plateau on Venus